John W. Holmes may refer to:

 John Wendell Holmes (1910–1988), Canadian diplomat and academic
 John W. Holmes (film editor) (1917–2001)